is a character in Resident Evil (Biohazard in Japan), a survival horror video game series created by Japanese company Capcom. She was introduced in the 2005 video game Resident Evil 4, in which she is presented as the daughter of the sitting President of the United States. She is briefly held captive by the Spanish cult Los Iluminados as a means of gaining influence over the United States President before being rescued by the game's protagonist, Leon S. Kennedy.

Ashley was originally designed by game designer Yasuhisa Kawamura as an important player character in the original version of Resident Evil 4. Her role was changed into that of companion character who is defenseless following a major structural change in the development team which led to the cancellation of the original version of Resident Evil 4. Her characterization has received a largely negative reception from video game publications, with many questioning her relevance as a stereotypical damsel in distress or usefulness as a sidekick character.

Concept and design 
Ashley was originally created as an unnamed character simply referred to as "Girl" by the game designer, Yasuhisa Kawamura. "Girl" was intended to be the second playable character of the initial version of Resident Evil 4. Scenarios featuring the character were written for the "Castle", "Hallucination," and "Zombie" builds. In the "Castle" scenario, she was supposed to be a test subject held against her will within an underground lab beneath a castle. With the help of a B.O.W. dog taught to follow her orders, she manages to escape. Following the 2002 edition of the Tokyo Game Show expo, the "Castle" game script by Kawamura and Noboru Sugimura was discarded, though Kawamura went on a new script based on the same story.

Development was restarted with a version of the "Castle" build script supplied by Sugimura when Shinji Mikami took over as director of the project in late 2003; the original version of Resident Evil 4 which was undergoing development was abandoned. "Girl" was reworked as the daughter of the American President, who player character Leon S. Kennedy must search for and rescue. She is written to be a defenseless companion who can be directed by the player to stay in a hiding place. Although Ashley is predominantly controlled by artificial intelligence whenever she is following Leon and is intended to be protected by him throughout the entire game, they must split up in certain narrative segments of the game, while others are played from her perspective. In the upcoming remake of Resident Evil 4, the team aims to expand Ashley's characterization and relationship with Leon due to the former's fears. Unlike in the original, Ashley has been completely changed and can be called to maintain distance, come close, and be unable to be left at the safe spot anymore, as Capcom realistically wanted. Yasuhiro Ampo said, "As a character, we wanted to have her by your side so she left an impression, and as a game, having her hide while you went and fought in the original was fun in some ways. But having a character like Ashley and then having her basically disappear for a while felt like a waste. "We wanted to avoid that in the remake." Ashley's health bar was also removed. She gets downed after taking too many blows, and Leon must revive her to continue; if she is attacked while she is vulnerable, the game ends.

Portrayal 
Carolyn Lawrence, who provided the voice for Ashley Graham in Resident Evil 4, described her character as "vulnerable, because Leon has to come to her rescue all the time". In June 2022, Ella Freya publicly disclosed that she is the face model of Ashley in the remake of Resident Evil 4.

Appearances

In Resident Evil 4

Ashley Graham is the newly-elected President Graham's 20-year-old daughter, kidnapped by Jack Krauser on her way home from Massachusetts and kept captive by the Los Illuminados in a European town. Leon S. Kennedy's first goal in the game is to find out where she is and bring her back. After meeting her, it becomes clear that she has been implanted with a Plaga parasite in order for the cult to gain control of her before returning her to America.

The rest of the game is about Leon and Ashley trying to discover a solution to get rid of the parasites inside their bodies before they are taken over by Osmund Saddler. Leon and Ashley escaped the sinking island with a jet ski left by Ada Wong after Saddler was eliminated. Leon graciously declined Ashley's invitation to visit her at her home. Following that, they are both apprehended by US government agents and put into detention for debriefing.

Other appearances
A framed photo of Ashley Graham is briefly glimpsed in the 2021 Netflix animated mini-series Resident Evil: Infinite Darkness, set after the events of Resident Evil 4. Her father, President Graham, is a major character in Infinite Darkness.

Ashley is set to appear in the 2023 remake of Resident Evil 4.

Reception 
Ashley has received a mostly negative reception. Several video game journalists criticized her as one of the worst and highly annoying character. Charlie Barratt of GamesRadar used her as an example of the "pure-hearted love interest", stating that this kind of character lacks personality. In 2012, 
Toadette Geldof of Vice described her as one of the lamest video game characters of all time, commenting that "She's so lame that she can't even really walk on her own, so you have to piggy-back her around and then set her back down any time you need to kill something." In 2016, Liz Finnegan of The Escapist criticized and ranked her as one of the hateable video game character. Commenting that "She’s defenseless and worthless and needs your help constantly." In 2017, Jessica Famularo of Inverse ranked her on the last of "best Resident Evil heroes". She criticized and said that "She's often written off for being helpless to an irritating degree. No one really wants her around, it would seem." In Tropes vs. Women in Video Games, feminist media critic Anita Sarkeesian described Ashley as a damsel in distress who appears to be helpless, arguing that defending her caused players a lot of frustration. Samara Summer of GamePro wished that Ashley doesn't appear in the remake of Resident Evil 4, claiming that "She can't fight, she can't free herself and she can't even look for a hiding place on her own. With her screaming she doesn't motivate me to help her either."

Ashley has been positively appraised by a few commentators. GameDaily listed Ashley Graham as part of its "Babe of the Week: Hottest Blondes" feature, adding that they would give her the "pain in the neck" award. Hollander Cooper of GamesRadar included her in their "Top 7 Game characters you're wrong for hating", commenting that "she'd sometimes get attacked by a Los Plagas, but she usually gave you plenty of time to spin-kick the assailant before being dragged away. Plus, you could always tell her to hide in a box or a trashcan, and she always did so without a fight." Thilo Bayer of PC Games Hardware also included her among the 112 most important female characters in games. David Craddock of Shacknews cited Ashley as one of his favorite video game companion, saying that "When you are saddled with her, she’s perfectly content to hide in a dumpster while you clear out enemies. If only all companions were so agreeable."

Analysis 
Andrei Nae of Immersion, Narrative, and Gender Crisis in Survival Horror Video Games said that Ashley Graham fully embodies the gender role of damsel in distress with her constants pleas to Leon Kennedy to help her. Bernard Perron of The World of Scary Video Games: A Study in Videoludic Horror felt that some characters, like Ashley, have been eroticized in which she can swap her schoolgirl uniform into a white starlet costume that "highlights her breast".

References 

Capcom protagonists
Female characters in video games
Fictional children of presidents of the United States
Resident Evil characters
Video game characters introduced in 2005
Video game sidekicks
Video game memes